Glitter is the soundtrack to the 2001 film of the same title and the eighth studio album by American singer-songwriter Mariah Carey. It was released on August 18, 2001, in Japan by Sony Music and in the United States on September 11, 2001, by Virgin Records. Mixing dance-pop, funk, hip hop and R&B, the album was a complete musical departure from any of Carey's previous releases, focusing heavily on recreating a 1980s post-disco era to accompany the film, set in 1983. By covering or heavily sampling several older tunes and songs, Carey created Glitter as an album that would help viewers connect with the film, as well as incorporating newly written ballads. The singer collaborated with Jimmy Jam and Terry Lewis and DJ Clue, who co-produced the album. Musically, Glitter was structured to be a retro-influenced album and have more of a dance-oriented element. On several songs, critics noted Carey to be more sexually suggestive lyrically than before. Glitter featured several musical acts such as Eric Benét, Ludacris, Da Brat, Busta Rhymes, Fabolous, and Ja Rule.

Upon release, both the album and its accompanying film were met with generally negative reviews from critics, who felt it failed in trying to capture a genuine 1980s theme, and there were too many guest appearances. Retrospective reviews, however, have been largely positive, with many saying the album was unfairly maligned. Universally, Glitter was viewed as a commercial and critical failure, leading to Virgin Records cancelling Carey's $100 million five-album contract and dropping her from the label. While it debuted at number seven on the US Billboard 200, at the time it marked Carey's lowest first-week sales of any album she had ever released. Internationally, it peaked outside the top ten in many countries, but topped the charts in Japan and Greece. Glitter became Carey's least successful album at the time, selling two million copies worldwide.

Several singles were released but attained weak charting positions. "Loverboy" served as the lead single from the album and quickly became Carey's lowest-charting lead single globally. As the song stalled on the US charts, Virgin dropped its price to spur sales, which helped the single peak at number two on the US Billboard Hot 100; internationally, the song failed to garner much traction. Subsequent singles failed to make much of an impact on prominent global charts, with some not charting at all. Nearly two decades after its release, Glitter began to attract wide praise from mainstream critics and has developed a cult following. On May 22, 2020, Carey announced the album's release on streaming services.

Background and development 

Following the release of Carey's album Butterfly in 1997, she began working on a film and soundtrack project titled at that time as All That Glitters. However, Columbia Records and Carey were also working on a greatest hits album to be released in time for Thanksgiving season in November 1998. Carey put All That Glitters on hold and her greatest hits album #1's was released in November 1998. Carey put the project on hold again to record her album Rainbow (1999). After the album ran its course, Carey wanted to finish the film and soundtrack project. But by this time, Carey and her now ex-husband Tommy Mottola, head of her record company Columbia, did not have a good working or personal relationship. Mottola wanted Carey off the label and Carey wanted to leave; however, she still owed Columbia one more album to fulfill her contract. Virgin Records stepped in and offered to pay Columbia $20 million to let Carey out of her contract early so that they could sign her for a $100 million deal.

Carey signed with Virgin and aimed to complete the film and soundtrack project. As part of her contract on her $100 million five-album record deal with Virgin Records, Carey was given full creative control. She opted to record an album partly mixed with 1980s influenced disco and other similar genres, in order to go with the film's setting. As the release date grew nearer, the film and album title were changed from All That Glitters to Glitter. In early 2001, Carey's relationship with Latin singer Luis Miguel ended, while she was busy filming Glitter and recording the soundtrack. Due to the pressure of losing her relationship, being on a new record label, filming a movie, and recording an album, Carey began to have a nervous breakdown. She began posting a series of disturbing messages on her official website, and displayed erratic behavior while on several promotional outings.

Music and lyrics 
Musically, Glitter was notably different from anything Carey had ever written or recorded, drawing influence from the 1980s. Due to the parent film taking place in 1983, the soundtrack harbored on recreating an older sound, while incorporating the usual pop-R&B ballads for which Carey was known. While some critics favored the album's retro style, and inclusion of several sampled melodies, many felt that Glitter lacked originality, and its excess of guest artists overpowered Carey's artistry. In an interview with MTV News, Carey described the album's content, as well as its influences:
There are songs that are definitely going to take people back and make them go, 'Oh, man, this song from the '80s — I loved it growing up'. Or people who never heard the songs before might be like, 'This is cool.' When you see the movie, you're gonna see the uptempo songs and the songs that are remakes in there as they would have sounded in the '80s, but the album is the way that I would make the record now, and the ballads can stand on their own as songs from a Mariah Carey album.
Serving as the project's lead single, "Loverboy" features a sample from "Candy" by American band Cameo, which interpolates the melody into the chorus and instrumental introduction. Additionally, aside from sampling "Candy" as the musical bed for the song, Cameo serves as a featured artist on the song. Sarah Rodman from the Boston Herald compared it to Carey's previous lead singles, and described its production as "another in an increasingly long line of glitzy, candy-coated, creatively stunted Carey songs". The song's lyrics and vocals were described as "super-sexed" by Sal Cinquemani from Slant Magazine when put into comparison with Carey's previous work. The official remix for "Loverboy" also earned a place on Glitter, adding rap verses from both Ludacris and Da Brat to the original version. Serving as the second single from Glitter, "Reflections (Care Enough)" was written by Carey and Philippe Pierre. Lyrically, the song'a protagonist "laments the end of a relationship", while confronting her mother regarding her early abandonment. Additionally, during its bridge, Carey "eerily" refers to abortion, "You could have had the decency / To give me up / Before you gave me life", as an option over abandoning the child. Cinquemani felt the song was reminiscent of Carey's ballads during the earlier lengths of her career, and described the song as a "simple beauty". In a review for the album in The Free Lance–Star, a writer outed the song's first verse "A displaced little girl / Wept years in silence / And whispers wishes you'd materialize / She pressed on night and day / To keep on living / And tried so many ways / To keep her soul alive" as his favorite lyric from Glitter, and described it as an "emotional and heart-wrenching ballad". The album's third release, "Never Too Far", was written and produced by Carey and Jimmy Jam and Terry Lewis. Described as an "adult-contemporary, slow-jam love song", the song's lyrics read "Too painful to talk about it, so I hold it in / So my heart can mend and be brave enough to love again", speaking of emotions felt by the protagonist in the film. "Never Too Far" features "a bed of synthesized strings, gentle drums and Spanish-style guitar" as its primary instrumentation, and incorporates violin and keyboard notes prior to the first verse. The fourth and final single from Glitter, "Don't Stop (Funkin' 4 Jamaica)", was composed by Carey and DJ Clue, and interpolates "Funkin' for Jamaica (N.Y.)" by Tom Browne. Featuring guest verses from Mystikal, with the former declaring "Ain't nothin' you could do with the man / Except for shake your ass and clap your hands", while Carey responds "Don't stop bay-beee, its ex-ta-see / Turn me up a little."  Conceptualized in 1997, "Lead the Way" was an unused track from Butterfly (1997), written and produced by Carey and Walter Afanasieff. The ballad was the last song composed by the pair, as they halted work with one another shortly after its completion, due to their growing creative differences. Though written, the song was recorded during 2000, as Carey began producing Glitter. Beginning with a classic and simple piano introduction, Carey starts the song with soft and breathy vocals, eventually leading to a vocal climax, in which she belts an 18-second note, the longest from any of her recordings. She described it as one of her "best vocal performances", as well as one of her "favorite songs." In an interview with MTV News, Carey addressed Glitter as well as "Lead the Way":

To me, Glitter is one of my best albums. A lot of people got confused, not knowing whether it was a soundtrack or an album or what. There's a song called 'Lead the Way' which I did on Ally McBeal, and it's coming out in January. I sang the song on [the show]. It's one of those ballads that basically everybody that's been following my career says reminds them of a 'Vision of Love'-type record, and that's one of my favorite songs from the record. The cool thing for me is to be able to tie in 'Never Too Far' and 'Hero'. Having the Greatest Hits coming out, to be able to tie in both those records is almost like a circle.
Carey's cover of the 1982 Indeep song "Last Night a D.J. Saved My Life" was one of the album's more club-themed songs. It features rappers Fabolous and Busta Rhymes, and was composed and produced by Carey and DJ Clue. Michael Paoletta from Billboard called it a "painful low" on Glitter, and commented how Carey seemed detached and over-powered on the song, due to the inclusion of several male guests. "Twister", another one of the album's ballads, drew strong comparisons to Carey's older work, in light of the very different remainder of the album. Paoletta called it "quietly heartbreaking", in reference to the song's lyrics, which relate to the suicide of Carey's friend and hairstylist, Tonjua Twist. According to Carey, Twist took her own life in the spring of 2000, and was known for her joy of life and her ability to put people at ease. She was "child like and effervescent", but behind her mask of happiness was "a well" of lifelong and deep-rooted pain. In "Twister", Carey described the hidden inner-struggle of her friend, and tried to find "closure"; her "way of saying goodbye". Chris Chuck from Daily News described its lyrics as "an airy requiem for a friend lost to suicide" and felt it was "the only memorable song on the album." With lyrics reading "Feelin' kinda fragile and I've got a lot to handle / But I guess this is my way of saying goodbye", David Browne from Entertainment Weekly felt that Carey was possibly referring to her own suicide rather than her friends, especially in light of the events that were taking place during the album's release. "Didn't Mean to Turn You On" is a cover of the 1984 Cherelle song of the same title. Aside from the heavy sampling of the hook and lyrics, Carey, who produced the song alongside Jimmy Jam and Terry Lewis, added keyboard notes and synthesizers to enhance the songs club appeal. In the song, Carey sings "I was only trying to be nice / Only trying to be nice / Sooooooo, I didn't mean to turn you on", indicating a woman who is weakly apologetic over fooling a man over intimacy. On the track "Want You", American singer Eric Benét duets with Carey, while lyrically implying and suggesting the "exploration of bedroom fantasies."

Singles 
"Loverboy" was released as the lead single from Glitter on June 18, 2001. The song received mixed reviews from music critics, with many both criticizing and praising the inclusion of the "Candy" sample. It became Carey's weakest charting lead single at the time, reaching number two on the Billboard Hot 100. Following Carey's publicized hospitalization and breakdown, as well as Virgin's price reduction on the single, "Loverboy" managed to attain a new peak of number two on the chart. Although being propelled by high sales, radio airplay was still weak, due to many radio DJs feeling tepid towards its 1980s retro sound. Accompanied by little promotion from Carey, due to her hospitalization, "Loverboy" quickly descended the Hot 100. Outside the United States, the song attained weak charting, peaking inside the top ten in Australia and Canada, and within the top twenty in Italy and the United Kingdom. The music video for "Loverboy" features Carey dressed in a variation of revealing outfits, while patrolling a large race track as her 'loverboy' wins the race. The video was notable for portraying Carey in a more sexually oriented manner than before.

"Never Too Far", the album's second single, was released on August 14, 2001. It failed to impact the main Billboard chart, and achieved weak international charting. Carey was unable to film a music video for the single, as she was still recovering from her collapse. Instead, a video was created using a scene taken directly from the film Glitter, where Billie Frank (played by Carey) sings the song at Madison Square Garden during her first sold-out concert. Frank's performance of the song in the film omits its entire second verse, and the song's development runs in parallel with the film's love story.

The album's third single, "Don't Stop (Funkin' 4 Jamaica)", released on September 11, 2001, mirrored the same weak charting as "Never Too Far", although receiving more rotation on MTV due to its video. Directed by Sanaa Hamri, it features the theme of southern bayous and lifestyles, and presents Carey and Mystikal in "southern style" clothing and hairstyles. Some shots feature three versions of Carey singing into a microphone on the screen at one time.

The fourth and final single released from Glitter was "Reflections (Care Enough)", which received a limited release in Japan on September 27, 2001. Following its limited promotional push from Virgin, and the absence of a music video, the song failed to make much of an impact.

Critical reception 

The website Metacritic, which averages professional reviews into a numerical score, assigned the album a score of 59/100, indicating "mixed or average reviews". AllMusic critic Stephen Thomas Erlewine gave the album two and a half out of five stars, calling it an "utter meltdown -- the pop equivalent of Chernobyl" and wrote "It's an embarrassment, one that might have been easier to gawk at if its creator wasn't so close to emotional destruction at the time of release." Michael Paoletta from Billboard was less critical, citing it as a "minor misstep in a stellar career that has earned the singer a few free passes. Editor Sarah Rodman from The Boston Herald gave Glitter a mixed review, praising Carey's song-writing and voice, although panning the excess of secondary musical guests. While criticizing the album's roster of appearances, Rodman wrote "the artists contribute mostly distracting, self-promoting jibber jabber all over what could have been Carey's best, most emotionally mature record to date." Daily News editor Chuck Campley rated the album two and a half out of five stars, writing "Maybe this was the best Mariah Carey could muster under the circumstances, but 'Glitter' needed more work." David Browne from Entertainment Weekly gave Glitter a mixed review, criticizing the abundance of rappers and describing Carey's vocals as "barely there" on several tracks. Concluding his review on a poor note, Browne wrote "'Glitter' is a mess, but its shameless genre hopping (and Carey's crash) makes it an unintentional concept album about the toll of relentless careerism."

Heather Vaughn from The Free-Lance Star gave Glitter a positive review, complimenting both the dance-oriented tracks, as well as the ballads. In reference to their weight on the album as a whole, Vaughn wrote "Sounds like Mariah's other albums, but with more of an 80s twist. The ballads really let you hear how stunning her voice actually is." Los Angeles Times critic and writer Natalie Nichols gave Glitter two out of a possible four stars, writing how Carey let the album "reflect the synth-driven robo-funk of that wretched decade." Nichols called the album's covers "tepid and pointless", while agreeing that Carey was overwhelmed by the many guest rappers, calling her voice "semi-disguised". Rob Sheffield from Rolling Stone gave the album three out of five stars, criticizing the ballads as "big and goopy, with zero melodic or emotional punch." Aside from the ballads, Sheffield felt Glitter failed to deliver the success or quality that Carey needed on her debut film and soundtrack. He concluded his review of the album with a comparison to Whitney Houston's massive The Bodyguard (1992), "Mariah still hasn't found her theme song, the one people will remember her voice by. Glitter is good enough to make you hope she finds it." Slant Magazine editor Sal Cinquemani awarded Glitter three out of five stars, writing "Carey's edgier tracks are inundated with so many guest artists that her sound ultimately becomes muddled; her pop tunes are so formulaic that it's difficult to distinguish one from the next." USA Todays Edna Gunderson rated the album one and a half out of four stars, criticizing Carey's overall image for the project, as well as the many guest artists on the record. She described Carey as "cheapening her image" and wrote "The whiff of desperation grows more pungent on 'Glitter' in Carey's gratuitous coloratura and transparent enlistment of street-cred boosters such as rappers Ja Rule and Mystikal.

 Commercial performance 
Glitter became Carey's least commercially successful album to that point. It debuted at number seven on the Billboard 200 with first-week sales of 116,000 copies, but far from the first-week sales of 323,000 with her previous release, Rainbow in 1999. Glitter became Carey's lowest peaking album in the United States, with her second album Emotions (1991), coming in at number four. It remained in the album's chart for only eight weeks, and was certified gold by the Recording Industry Association of America (RIAA), denoting shipments of 500,000 units; and as it fell from the charts, received platinum certification, denoting shipments of 1 million in the US. As of November 2018, Nielsen SoundScan estimates sales of the Glitter album at 666,000 copies in the United States. In Canada, the album peaked at number four on the Canadian Albums Chart. Glitter entered the Australian Albums Chart at its peak position of number thirteen, during the week dated September 9, 2001. Remaining in the chart for only three weeks, the album made its exit at number forty on September 23. Similarly in Austria, Glitter peaked at number fourteen, remaining on the albums chart for only four weeks.

In both the Flemish and Wallonian territories in Belgium, Glitter peaked at numbers ten and eleven, respectively, while charting for a total of four weeks. In France, Glitter peaked at number five on the albums chart, during the week dated September 15, 2001. Following seventeen weeks fluctuating in the chart, the album was certified Gold by the Syndicat National de l'Édition Phonographique (SNEP), denoting shipments of 100,000 units. On the Dutch Albums Chart, Glitter debuted at number twenty-six, during the week dated September 22, 2001. Reaching its peak position of number twelve the following week, the album remained a total of six weeks in the albums chart. In both New Zealand and Norway, Glitter peaked at number eleven, staying within the chart for four and one weeks, respectively. In Switzerland, the album peaked at number seven, and stayed within the chart for ten weeks. The International Federation of the Phonographic Industry (IFPI) certified Glitter Gold in Switzerland, for shipments of 20,000 copies. On the UK Albums Chart dated September 22, 2001, the album made its debut at number ten. The following week, Glitter fell to number twenty-seven, staying in the chart for one more additional week. British sales of the album are at 55,080 units as of July 2014. In Japan, Glitter saw particular commercial success, debuting atop the albums chart and selling 450,000 units within a month of release. The album has sold over two million copies worldwide as of 2002.

In November 2018, the album became the subject of a campaign by Carey fans as part of the build-up to her fifteenth studio album, Caution. This led to it reaching number one on the iTunes albums charts in several countries including the United States, and top 10 in several countries worldwide.

 Controversies 
 "Loverboy" sample 
Throughout 2000, Carey had already been writing and recording material for Glitter and during this period, she developed the concept for "Loverboy". Originally, Carey had sampled the melody and hook from the 1978 Yellow Magic Orchestra song "Firecracker", using an interpolation of it throughout the chorus and introduction. In early theatrical trailers for Glitter, the original version of "Loverboy" was still featured. As Carey had ended her contract with Columbia Records, Jennifer Lopez was signed by Tommy Mottola, and had begun recording material for her album, J.Lo (2001). According to record producer Irv Gotti, Mottola knew of Carey's usage of the "Firecracker" sample, and attempted to have Lopez use the same sample before her. At the time, Carey had become increasingly paranoid over outside executives being informed about Glitter, especially following news of Lopez's "theft" of the song. When the music publishers for "Firecracker" were questioned, they admitted Carey had licensed usage of the sample first (and was in fact the first artist to ever request a license for a sample of that song), and Lopez had signed for it over one month later, under Mottola's arrangement. Ultimately, Carey was unable to use the original sample, as Lopez's album was to be released far earlier than Glitter. She subsequently changed the composition of "Loverboy", and incorporated a new sample, "Candy" by Cameo. The "Firecracker" sample was eventually used by Lopez on her song "I'm Real" and according to Gotti, Mottola contacted him with instructions to create the Murder Remix of "I'm Real" to sound exactly like another Glitter track he produced, titled "If We" featuring rappers Ja Rule and Nate Dogg. The original version of "Loverboy" with the "Firecracker" sample was later included on Carey's 2020 compilation album The Rarities.

 TRL incident 
Following commencement for Glitter and the release of the soundtrack's lead single "Loverboy", Carey embarked on a short promotional campaign for the song and its parent album. On July 19, 2001, Carey made a surprise appearance on the MTV program Total Request Live (TRL). As the show's host Carson Daly began taping following a commercial break, Carey began singing "Loverboy" a cappella from behind a curtain. As he questioned the audience, she came out onto the filming stage, pushing an ice cream cart while wearing a large men's shirt. Seemingly anxious and exhilarated, Carey began delivering individual bars of ice cream to fans and guests on the program, while waving to the crowd down below on Times Square, and joking that the event was her "therapy". Carey then walked to Daly's platform and began a striptease, in which she shed her shirt to reveal a tight yellow and green ensemble, leading him to exclaim "Mariah Carey has lost her mind!" While she later revealed that Daly was aware of her presence in the building prior to her appearance, she admitted that he was meant to act surprised in order to provide a more dramatic effect for the program. Carey's appearance on TRL garnered strong media attention, with many critics and newspapers citing her behavior as "troubled" and "erratic".

 Hospitalization 
In the days following her appearance on TRL, Carey began displaying what was described as "erratic behavior". On July 20, Carey held a record signing for the CD single of "Loverboy" at Roosevelt Field shopping mall in Long Island before fans and the media. As a camera crew covered the event, she began rambling on several subjects before finally discussing radio host Howard Stern and how his jokes about herself on his program bothered her greatly and how everything general in life should be positive. At that point, Carey's publicist, Cindi Berger, grabbed the microphone from her hand, and asked the news crew to stop filming. Berger said later, "She was not speaking clearly and not talking about what she had come to talk about: her record." Only days later, Carey began posting irregular voice notes and messages on her official website:
I'm trying to understand things in life right now and so I really don't feel that I should be doing music right now. What I'd like to do is just a take a little break or at least get one night of sleep without someone popping up about a video. All I really want is [to] just be me and that's what I should have done in the first place ... I don't say this much but guess what, I don't take care of myself.
Following the quick removal of the messages, Berger commented that Carey had been "obviously exhausted and not thinking clearly" when she posted the letters. Two days later, on July 26, she was hospitalized, citing "extreme exhaustion" and a "physical and emotional breakdown". News websites and programs began reporting how Carey threatened to commit suicide by slitting her wrists the night before, and how Patricia, Carey's mother, hastily called for help. When questioned regarding Carey's suicidal rumor, Berger claimed Carey had broken dishes out of desperation, and as a result, accidentally cut her hands and feet. Following her induction at an un-disclosed hospital in Connecticut, Carey remained hospitalized and under doctor's care for two weeks, followed by an extended absence from the public.

In April 2018, Carey revealed in a People magazine interview that during the hospitalization, she was diagnosed with Bipolar II disorder.

 Project delay 
Following the heavy media coverage surrounding Carey's publicized breakdown and hospitalization, Virgin Records and 20th Century Fox delayed the release of Glitter, as well as its soundtrack of the same name. The announcement was made on August 9, 2001, that both the soundtrack and the film would be postponed three weeks, respectively from August 21 to September 11, and from August 31 to September 21. When asked regarding the motives behind the delay, Nancy Berry, vice chairman of Virgin Music Group Worldwide, addressed Carey's personal and physical condition:
Mariah is looking forward to being able to participate in both her album and movie projects and we are hopeful that this new soundtrack release date will allow her to do so. She has been making great recovery progress, and continues to grow stronger every day. Virgin Music Worldwide continues to give its absolute commitment and support to Mariah on every level.
When discussing the project's weak commercial reaction, Carey blamed the terrorist attacks of September 11. Carey made specific remarks regarding the album's commercial failure stating, "I released it on September 11, 2001. The talk shows needed something to distract from 9/11. I became a punching bag. I was so successful that they tore me down because my album was at number 2 instead of number 1. The media was laughing at me and attacked me." Vulture writer Matthew Jacobs noted that, "two dynamics were working against [the film] at once: post-9/11, Americans simply weren't going to the movies, and certainly not to see what had been framed as a slice of celebrity fluff".

 Departure from Virgin 
Glitter performed poorly at the box office. Following the poor sales of the album as well, Virgin invoked a clause in its contract with Carey that allowed the label to remove itself from the $100 million deal for approximately $28 million. Subsequently, Virgin dismissed Carey from the label roster. These decisions were brought on due to the low sales of the album, as well as the negative publicity surrounding her breakdown. While the two sides were laying out the terms for her exit from Virgin, Carey's team requested that the two parties just use the word "canceled" when asked by the media regarding the failed venture. Less than 24 hours after the settlement was made, Virgin released a statement that they had "terminated" the contract with Carey, and paid her $28 million to do so. Carey's lawyers threatened to sue, with her attorney Marshall Grossman calling their behavior in the matter "deplorable". Virgin replied that in terms of Carey's payout, they only listed the money they gave her for departing, not including the $23.5 million they already had paid while under contract for the first and only album they released by her. Additionally, Virgin stated they would counter-sue Carey for "defamation" following Carey's press release. The matter was resolved outside of court, with Carey and Virgin opting not to take the matter to the judicial system. Soon after, Carey flew to Italy for a period of five months. After several months, Carey signed a new $20 million deal with Island Records, which also included Carey's own vanity label, MonarC Entertainment.

 Legacy and cultural impact 

Almost two decades after its release, Glitter began to attract wide reappraisal and praise from mainstream critics and has developed a cult following. Kara Brown of Jezebel praised Glitter and cited: "Mariah was ahead of us all and the time is now". Mike Waas of Idolator commented that Glitter was "a misunderstood  [record]" and called it "the biggest pop music injustices of the 21st century". Daniel Welsh of MSN gave the album a positive feedback and felt that "the brilliance of Glitter has gone unappreciated for too long". In a later article for Complex, Michael Arceneaux described the album as "the perfect '80s tribute". In a Vulture article, Dee Lockett described this record as "undeniably ahead of its time even despite it being an homage to disco."

In 2017, Everett Brothers of Billboard ranked "Lead the Way" as the second most underappreciated song of Carey's discography, while "There for Me", a B-side track of "Never Too Far/Hero Medley" 2001 single, was picked as the third best song out this rate. Brothers argues that "Lead the Way" shows Carey's "strongest vocal performance of the 2000s." Rich Juzwiak of Gawker ranked "Loverboy" as the eighteenth best single of Carey's career. In 2014 article for MySpace, Steven J. Horowitz praised a remix version of "Loverboy", which was included to Glitter tracklist: "Mariah invoked the ‘80s and relatively played the background to satiating verses from hot-right-nows and longtime friends.". He placed this version on the 11th place of Carey's all remixes rating, while Mark Graham of VH1 ordered this remix as the thirtieth best song of her catalog.

In October 2020, after 19 years, the original version of "Loverboy", with the "Firecracker" sample, was released as part of the compilation album The Rarities. In an article celebrating 20 years of Glitters release, Billboard writer Jon O'Brien stated that,"Glitter was heavily criticized at the time for overloading its ten tracks with guest rappers. DJ Clue, Busta Rhymes and Fabolous essentially relegate Carey to supporting player on a perfunctory cover of Indeep's club classic "Last Night a DJ Saved My Life," while Nate Dogg and Ja Rule compete for attention on the anachronistic turn-of-the-century hip-pop of "If We." Yet look at any given top 10 from the last decade and you could argue Carey was simply foreshadowing a time when every other hit has a featuring, vs or x credit".

PopMatters writer Peter Piatkowski called it one of the "best dance-pop albums of the last 20 years.

 #JusticeForGlitter 
In November 2018, the album became the subject of a campaign by Carey fans as part of the build-up to her fifteenth studio album, Caution. Promoted on social media with the hashtag , the campaign resulted in the album reaching number one on the iTunes albums charts in several countries including the United States, and top 10 in several countries worldwide. Carey herself acknowledged and praised the campaign through social media and interviews. She eventually added a medley of songs from the album on her Caution World Tour, as a thank you to her fans.

 Track listing Notes'''
  signifies an additional producer
  signifies a co-producer
 "Loverboy" and "Loverboy (Remix)" both contain a sample of "Candy" by Cameo.
 "Didn't Mean to Turn You On" is a cover of Cherrelle's "I Didn't Mean to Turn You On". The cover is produced by Jimmy Jam and Terry Lewis, who produced Cherrelle's original song. Mariah sang over the original instrumental as well.
 "Don't Stop (Funkin' 4 Jamaica)" contains interpolates of  "Funkin' for Jamaica (N.Y.)" by Tom Browne.
 "Last Night a DJ Saved My Life" contains a sample of  "Put Your Hands Where My Eyes Could See" by Busta Rhymes and is a cover of "Last Night a D.J. Saved My Life" by Indeep.

 Personnel 
Credits for Glitter adapted from AllMusic.

 Mariah Carey – arranger, executive producer, producer, vocal arrangement, vocals, background vocals
 Eric Benét – performer
 Elliott Blakey – assistant
 Lee Blaske – string arrangements
 Busta Rhymes – performer
 Cameo – performer
 Da Brat –  performer
 Damizza – producer
 Dana Jon Chappelle – engineer, vocal engineer, mixing
 DJ Clue – producer, background vocals
 Fabolous – performer
 Tony Gonzales – assistant
 Kevin Guarnieri – assistant engineer, digital editing
 Fernando Harkless – flute
 Michael Herring – guitar
 Steve Hodge – engineer, mixing
 Ja Rule – performer
 Jimmy Jam – arranger, executive producer, producer, production assistant
 John Kennedy – violin
 Clark Kent – producer
 Anthony Kilhoffer – assistant
 Terry Lewis – arranger, executive producer, producer, production assistant
 Bryan Loren – keyboards
 Trey Lorenz – background vocals
 Ludacris – performer
 Bob Ludwig – mastering
 Brenda Mickens – violin
 Mystikal – performer
 Jon Nettlesbey – assistant
 Pete Novak – assistant
 Tim Olmstead – assistant
 Derek Organ – drums
 Alice Preves – violin
 Alexander Richbourg – drum programming
 David Rideau – engineer
 Torrel Ruffin – guitar
 Leslie Shank – violin
 Pitnarry Shin – cello
 Ryan Smith – assistant
 Xavier Smith – assistant, assistant engineer, mixing
 Jason Stasium – assistant
 Tamas Strasser – violin
 Mary Ann Tatum – background vocals
 Bradley Yost – assistant, assistant engineer, mixing

 Charts 

 Weekly charts 

 Monthly charts 

 Year-end charts 

 Certifications and sales 

 Release history 

 References 

 Bibliography 

 

 External links 
 Glitter'' at Metacritic

Mariah Carey albums
Albums produced by Jimmy Jam and Terry Lewis
Albums produced by Walter Afanasieff
2001 soundtrack albums
2001 albums
Virgin Records soundtracks
Albums produced by DJ Clue?
Funk soundtracks
Contemporary R&B soundtracks
Musical film soundtracks
Drama film soundtracks